Tonovay (also Ton of Hay) is an unincorporated community in Greenwood County, Kansas, United States.  It is located approximately 5 miles east of the city of Eureka along K-99 highway.

References

Further reading

External links
 Greenwood County maps: Current, Historic, KDOT

Unincorporated communities in Greenwood County, Kansas
Unincorporated communities in Kansas